Christopher Garnett may refer to:
Christopher Garnett, member of the Board of the Olympic Delivery Authority
Christopher Garnett (politician), British politician
Chris Garnett, youth worker for PETA